Research funding in the United Kingdom is divided mainly among  Non-Departmental Government Bodies: UK Research and Innovation ('UKRI'), and 'Higher Education Funding Bodies'. The budgets of both the UK Research Councils (which later merged into UKRI) and the Higher Education Funding Bodies budgets were set by the Department for Business, Innovation and Skills prior to 2016, at which point Department was succeeded by the Department for Business, Energy and Industrial Strategy. UK research funding follows the government policy, the 'Haldane principle', this means research is evaluated by scientists themselves through peer review, not politicians.

UK Research Councils

There are seven Research Councils in the UK (see table below), all of which are now part of UK Research and Innovation. Each council receives funding from the Government's Science Budget (administered through the Department for Business, Innovation and Skills) to fund research in a different area of research with a view to improving the UK economy, society and creating a sustainable world. Some Research Councils also receive income from other Government Departments, commercialisation of research and other research funders.

Higher Education Funding Bodies (UK Funding Councils)

The four Higher Education Funding Bodies, also referred to as "Funding Councils" (listed below) provide "block grant funding" to support research infrastructure and enable institutions to undertake ground-breaking research.

Dual Research Funding Support System

The Research Councils and the Higher Education Funding Bodies make up a dual support system. Research Councils provide grants for specific projects and programmes, while the Higher Education Funding Bodies provide block grant funding to support the research infrastructure and enable institutions research of their choosing. Such funding also provides the capacity to undertake research commissioned by the private sector, Government Departments, charities, the European Union and other international bodies.

Government funding

The Government's research budget allocations for the financial year 15/16 are outlined below.

See also
Research Councils UK
Haldane principle
Brexit and arrangements for science and technology

References

Higher education in the United Kingdom
Research and development in the United Kingdom
Science and technology in the United Kingdom